Polypogon is a genus of litter moths of the family Erebidae. The genus was described by Franz von Paula Schrank in 1802. In the past, Zanclognatha species were included in Polypogon.

Species
Polypogon caffrarium (Möschler, 1883)
Polypogon fractale (Guenée, 1854)
Polypogon fractalis (Guenée, 1854)
Polypogon gryphalis (Herrich-Schäffer, 1851)
Polypogon lunalis (Scopoli, 1763)
Polypogon malhama (Hacker, 2011)
Polypogon plumigeralis (Hübner, 1825)
Polypogon saldaitis (Hacker, 2011)
Polypogon strigilatus (Linnaeus, 1758) – common fan-foot
Polypogon tentacularia (Linnaeus, 1758)
Polypogon yemenitica (Hacker, 2011)
Polypogon zammodia (Bethune-Baker, 1911)
Polypogon zelleralis (Wocke, 1850)

References

Herminiinae
Moth genera